Ganem W. Washburn (October 29, 1823 – October 7, 1907) was an American lawyer, judge, and politician.  He was a Wisconsin Circuit Court Judge for 15 years, and served two years in the Wisconsin State Senate.  His name is sometimes incorrectly abbreviated "Geo. W. Washburn" in historical documents.

Biography

Born in Livermore, Maine, Washburn was the son of Reuel Washburn, a Maine legislator, and cousin of Israel Washburn, Jr., the 29th Governor of Maine. Washburn graduated from Bowdoin College in 1845. He then studied law with his father and his cousin Israel Washburn, Jr., in Orono, Maine. He was admitted to the Maine bar in 1847 and then moved to Oshkosh, Wisconsin Territory, where he continued to practice law. In 1859 and 1860, Washburn served in the Wisconsin State Senate. From 1861 to 1864, Washburn served as Winnebago County court judge. From 1864 to 1879, Washburn served as a Wisconsin Circuit Court judge. In 1879, Washburn resigned from the bench because of impaired hearing. Washburn then supervised his real estate holdings and his farm. Washburn died suddenly of heart failure at his home in Oshkosh, Wisconsin.

Notes

External links

1823 births
1907 deaths
People from Livermore, Maine
Politicians from Oshkosh, Wisconsin
Bowdoin College alumni
Maine lawyers
Wisconsin lawyers
Wisconsin state court judges
Wisconsin state senators
Washburn family
19th-century American politicians
19th-century American judges